Adriana Ailincăi (born 11 April 1999) is a Romanian rower. She competed in the 2020 Summer Olympics.

References

External links

1999 births
Living people
Rowers at the 2020 Summer Olympics
Romanian female rowers
Olympic rowers of Romania
21st-century Romanian women
World Rowing Championships medalists for Romania